Steven Woodcock (born 13 July 1961) is a British film director, writer, and producer. He has made two movies set in north England, Between Two Women and The Jealous God. They are similar, being 1950s & 60s set, and resemble each other in how they were made but they are different in tone and narrative style. Woodcock has written at least one book under his own name, the novel of Between Two Women on which he based his film screenplay.

In the DVD documentary The Making of Between Two Women, Steven Woodcock takes the viewer into the main set for his third feature film Flight into Camden, to explain his filming methods. Various newspaper articles still on the web refer to this movie – an adaptation of the award-winning novel by Booker Prize winning David Storey, author of the classic This Sporting Life.

Early life

Steven Woodcock grew up in Huddersfield, West Riding of Yorkshire, England. He lived in Berry Brow and Milnsbridge, the latter an industrialized suburb to the west of Huddersfield centre where British Prime Minister Harold Wilson grew up. Many scenes in Woodcock’s films were shot in and around where he once lived. Milnsbridge’s imposing railway viaduct and part of Market Street are seen at the start of Between Two Women as are mills and factory chimneys (since the filming the mills have been converted into apartment blocks). Other locations in Huddersfield have included Fartown, Longwood, Beaumont Park, Holmfirth, Linthwaite, Marsden and a mill at Newsome. Scenes were also shot in nearby Bradford, Halifax and Keighley.

Woodcock attended Berry Brow Junior School as a boy, then Newsome High School and Sports College between 1972–77 and Greenhead College from 1977–79. He then went to Batley School of Art and Design and Manchester University where he studied Industrial Design. By the time he was only 20 both his parents were dead. His father had died when Woodcock was still very young, leaving his widowed mother to bring him up on her own.

Later career
Throughout his childhood Woodcock wanted to work in movie and TV special effects. To try to get into the industry he made special effects films on 16mm in his spare time while at university. He says he was ridiculed by his school teachers when he was a teenager for saying he intended to work for famous Thunderbirds producer Gerry Anderson, yet when he was only 21 he achieved this, designing and making numerous special effects models for the TV show Terrahawks. He was not given a screen credit so to make up for it secretly wrote his large initials and date of birth with Letraset on the side of his spaceship models, in effect signing them. He also worked on blockbuster movies such as Aliens at Pinewood Studios and also the TV show, Wind in the Willows. For over ten years he ran his own model and special effects company mainly servicing advertising.

Other work
Steven Woodcock has written for the Yorkshire Post newspaper as an editorial columnist on the opinion pages. Some of his newspaper and magazine articles are illustrated with his own dramatic black and white art photographs, possibly explaining why his movies are well shot. His writing ranges from straight socio political commentary through issues about morality (the major theme in his films) and the arts. He wrote an off-the-wall piece about why such a prolific weed as the dandelion is his favourite flower.

Steven Woodcock was interviewed in a 12-page article in 2007 by the Gerry Anderson fan magazine, FAB. In it he said he'd made the movies he made because they were easier to finance than big budget action or sci-fi films, which he'd always wanted to make. At the time of the interview he was developing an action TV show with a British TV channel and he said it was more like the American CSI cop shows than his films.

In February 2006 Steven Woodcock and his co-producer wife Julie were featured in a prime-time documentary at 7.30pm on ITV1 called My Northwest, where they were interviewed about their films and clips were shown from the star studded Odeon premiere of The Jealous God that was simultaneously broadcast live on British TV by ITV, BBC, and Sky.

References

1961 births
British film directors
People from Huddersfield
Living people